The Radishchev Museum in Saratov opened to the public on June 29, 1885. It is supposed to have been Russia's first major public art museum outside Moscow or St. Petersburg.  It was founded by Alexey Bogolyubov and named after his grandfather, the 18th-century revolutionary writer Alexander Radishchev. The naming of the museum after the "first Russian revolutionary", Alexander Radishchev, was a direct challenge to the authorities: Bogolyubov had to endure a legal battle to get permission. It was the first art museum in Russia open to everybody. It was opened to the general public seven years earlier than the Tretyakov Gallery in Moscow and fifteen years earlier than the Russian Museum in Saint Petersburg.

It includes work by Camille Corot, Auguste Rodin, Ivan Kramskoy, Vasily Polenov, Ilya Repin, Ivan Shishkin, Fyodor Vasilyev, Aleksandra Ekster, Pavel Kuznetsov, Aristarkh Lentulov, Robert Falk, Pyotr Konchalovsky, Martiros Saryan, Fyodor Rokotov  and others.  Early donors included Pavel Tretyakov and Pauline Viardot.

During the Great Patriotic War, future Director of the Belarusian National Art Museum, Alena Aladava, worked there.

References

Art museums and galleries in Russia
Art museums established in 1885
Museums in Saratov Oblast
1885 establishments in the Russian Empire
Cultural heritage monuments in Saratov Oblast
Objects of cultural heritage of Russia of federal significance